Drag Race Belgique (sometimes called Drag Race Belgium) is a Belgian French-language reality television series based on the American series RuPaul's Drag Race. The series is broadcast through Tipik in Belgium, and airs on WOW Presents Plus internationally. The Belgian series is hosted by Canadian drag queen Rita Baga, who was a runner-up on the first season of Canada's Drag Race. Lufy and Mustii serve alongside Rita Baga on the judges' panel.

Production 
With the expansion of the Drag Race franchise going throughout Sweden, France, and the Philippines; World of Wonder announced a Belgian adaptation with RuPaul and Tom Campbell as executive producers. It was later revealed that French-speaking Quebecois queen Rita Baga would be the host and head judge of the upcoming series. At RuPaul's DragCon UK, the judges panel were revealed with Lufy, an entrepreneur and content creator; and Mustii, a singer and actor.

Contestants 

Ages, names, and cities stated are at time of filming.

Notes:

Contestant progress

Lip syncs
Legend:

Guest judges 
Listed in chronological order:
, comedian
Rokia Bamba, DJ
BJ Scott, singer
, actor and comedian
, fashion designer
, examining magistrate and television personality
Plastic Bertrand, musician, producer, and television presenter

Episodes

References 

2023 in LGBT history
2023 Belgian television series debuts
Belgian reality television series
Belgian television series based on American television series
 
French-language television programming in Belgium
Tipik (TV channel) original programming
WOW Presents Plus original programming